The 74th Guards Rifle Division was a Guards infantry division of the Red Army during the Second World War. Its full formal name was the 74th Guards Nizhnedneprovskiy Order of Lenin twice Red Banner Order of Bogdan Khmelnitsky Rifle Division. It was formed from the 45th Rifle Division on 1 March 1943. The division's entire World War II service was with the 62nd Army, later the 8th Guards Army.

World War II Service

1943
In July 1943, the Division participated in the battles on the outskirts of Izium, Izyum-Barvenkovo Offensive, in August 1943 in the Barvenkov-Pavlograd Offensive, as part of the Donbass Strategic Offensive Operation . In the Lower Dnieper Offensive Operation crossed the Dnieper south of Dnipropetrovsk. During Nizhnedneprovskiy offensive forced the Dnieper to the south of Dnipropetrovsk. Then took part in the Nikopol–Krivoi Rog Offensive.

1944
During the Winter Spring campaign of 1944 the division participated in the Bereznegovatoye-Snigirevka Offensive and the follow on Odessa Offensive.
 
In July 1944 the division participated in the Lublin-Brest Offensive as part of the Operation Bagration and the beginning of the liberation of Poland.

1945
In January 1945 the division was part of the Vistula–Oder Offensive and the liberation of Poland.

In April 1945 it broke through enemy defenses at the Battle of the Seelow Heights, taking part in the Berlin Strategic Offensive.

During the war the division participated in the liberation of the cities of Izium, Nikopol, Krivoy Rog, Odessa, Poznan, Lodz, and taking Kustrin.

Postwar 
The division became part of the Group of Soviet Forces in Germany along with its corps and army, and was disbanded in the summer of 1946.

Subordination 
 South-Western Front, 62nd Army - 1 April 1943.
 South-Western Front, 8th Guards Army, 29th Guards Rifle Corps - from 5 May 1943.
 3rd Ukrainian Front, 8th Guards Army, 29th Guards Rifle Corps - about 20 October 1943.
 1st Belorussian Front, 8th Guards Army, 29th Guards Rifle Corps — about 15 June 1944.
 With 8th Guards Army of the 1st Belorussian Front May 1945.

Composition 
 226th Guards Rifle "Lodz" Regiment
 236th Guards Rifle Regiment
 240th Guards Rifle Regiment
 157th Guards Artillery Regiment
 82nd Guards separate antitank battalion
 399th Guards antiaircraft battery (up to 13 April 1943)
 76th Guards intelligence company
 85th Guards sapper battalion
 103rd Guards separate battalion
 584th (77th) Medical battalion
 73rd Guards separate company chemical protection
 725th (78th) trucking company
 659th (79th) field bakery
 676th (75th) Divisional veterinary hospital
 781st Field Postal Station
 538th field ticket office of the State Bank

Commanders 
 Colonel Vasily Pavlovich Sokolov (1 March 1942 - 1 September 1943), 1943 promoted to major general
 Colonel Mikhail Ivanovich Yugatov (2 September 1943 - 29 November 1943)
 Colonel Adrian T. Kuzin (30 November 1943 - 31 January 1944)
 Colonel Dmitry Yevstigneyevich Bakanov (1 February 1944 - 1 May 1944)
 Colonel Karl Karlovich Mazheika (11 May 1944 - 3 June 1944)
 Major General Dmitry Yevstigneyevich Bakanov (4 June 1944 - 5 August 1945)

Awards
 Awarded the Order of Bogdan Khmelnitsky 2 degrees Order of Bogdan Khmelnitsky II degree
 13 Feb 1944 — given the name "Nizhnedneprovskiy"

References

Citations

Bibliography

Further reading
 Vladimir Abyzov, The Final Assault, 1945, Novosti Press Agency Publishing House, Moscow, 1985. A short memoir of a rifleman of the 236th Guards Rifle Regiment.

G074